Henry I ( 1170 – 1252), a member of the House of Ascania, was Count of Anhalt from 1212 and the first ruling Anhalt prince from 1218 until his death.

Life
He was the oldest son of Count Bernhard of Anhalt probably by his first wife Judith (or Jutta) of Poland, a daughter of Mieszko III the Old. Bernhard was enfeoffed with the Duchy of Saxony by Emperor Frederick Barbarossa after the deposition of the Welf duke Henry the Lion in 1180. After his death in 1212, his surviving sons divided his lands according to the laws of the House of Ascania: Henry received the old Ascanian allodial possessions in the Saxon Schwabengau around Ballenstedt, where he established the Principality of Anhalt; while his younger brother Albert inherited the Saxon ducal title and retained several unconnected Eastphalian estates around the towns of Wittenberg and Belzig (later Saxe-Wittenberg) as well as the northern lordship of Lauenburg. 

Henry initially was a loyal supporter of the Hohenstaufen heir Frederick II, though later he temporarily switched sides to his Welf rival, Emperor Otto IV, was at feud with the Archbishops of Magdeburg, and campaigned the estates of Nienburg Abbey. From about 1215, he began to style himself "prince" (princeps), and by Otto's death in 1218 was officially elevated to that rank attending the Hoftag diets of Emperor Frederick II. From 1220 Henry acted as a guardian for the minor sons of his Ascanian cousin, the late Margrave Albert II of Brandenburg, rivalling with both the Magdeburg archbishop Albert I of Käfernburg and his brother, Duke Albert of Saxony. 

Henry backed Emperor Frederick II during the rebellion of his son Henry (VII) in 1234 as well as on his Italian campaigns against the Lombard League, participating in the 1238 Siege of Brescia. Back in Germany, he became involved in the conflict between the Magdeburg archbishop Wilbrand von Käfernburg with his Ascanian cousins, the Margraves of Brandenburg, whereby the Nienburg estates were devastated by the troops of Margrave Otto III in 1242. Both sides reconciled in 1245, mediated by Duke Otto I of Brunswick who married his daughter Matilda, a niece of the Brandenburg margraves, off to Prince Henry's eldest son, Henry II.

Before his death, about 1245, Henry retired and divided the Anhalt principality between his sons: Henry II inherited Aschersleben, Bernhard received Bernburg, and Siegfried took Zerbst. His youngest surviving sons, Hermann and Magnus, were ordained priests. The House of Ascania ruled the Duchy of Anhalt until 1918.

Literary patron and poet
Henry's most famous ministerialis (bondsman) was Eike von Repgow, a Saxon noble from Reppichau, who compiled the Sachsenspiegel, the most important legal code of the German Middle Ages. The prince also was a renowned Minnesänger. At the beginning of the 14th century, five of his Minnelieder (love songs) were copied into the Codex Manesse, an exceptionally beautiful collection. In this source, he is erroneously referred to as "Duke" (Herzog).

Marriage and issue
About the year 1211 Henry married Irmgard (born c. 1197 – died c. 1244), daughter of the Ludovingian landgrave Hermann I of Thuringia and a second cousin of the Hohenstaufen emperor Frederick II through her paternal grandmother Judith of Swabia. They had eleven children:

Henry II, Prince of Anhalt-Aschersleben (born 1215 – died 12 June 1266)
Judith (died after 14 May 1277), married by 10 March 1233 to Lord Nicholas I of Werle
Sophie (died 23 November 1272), first married to Duke Otto I of Merania, secondly to Count Siegfried of  Regenstein, and thirdly to Otto of Hadmersleben
Bernhard I, Prince of Anhalt-Bernburg (born c. 1218 – died 1287)
Albert (died c. 1245), a Franciscan friar
Hermann (died 1289), a canon in Halberstadt
Magnus (died after 18 June 1264), a canon in Magdeburg
Otto (died after 19 July 1246), a canon in Magdeburg
Siegfried I, Prince of Anhalt-Zerbst (born c. 1230 – died Köthen, 25 March 1298)
Hedwig (died 21 December 1259), married on 8 May 1242 to Duke Boleslaw II of Silesia and Liegnitz-Glogau
Gertrud (died 1275), Abbess of Gernrode (1260–1275).

Ancestors 

|-

Counts of Anhalt
Princes of Anhalt
1170s births
1252 deaths
Year of birth uncertain
Minnesingers
13th-century German poets